Grand-Mère station is a Via Rail station in Shawinigan, Quebec, Canada. It is located on 8th Street South in the Grand-Mère area. The station is actually a signpost only and serves as an optional stop for two Via Rail routes running from Montreal.

External links

Via Rail stations in Quebec
Buildings and structures in Shawinigan
Transport in Shawinigan
Railway stations in Mauricie